The 1890 college football season was the season of American football played among colleges and universities in the United States during the 1890–91 academic year. 

The 1890 Harvard Crimson football team compiled a perfect 11–0 record, outscored opponents by a total of 555 to 12, and was recognized as the national champion by the Billingsley Report, Helms Athletic Foundation, Houlgate System, National Championship Foundation, and Parke H. Davis.

In the Midwest, the Baker Methodists defeated the Kansas Jayhawks by a score of 22–9 in the first college football game played in Kansas. In the South, Vanderbilt Commodores defeated Nashville (Peabody), 40–0, in the first college football game played in Tennessee.

As the popularity of the sport increased, several notable programs were established in 1890, including Colorado, Illinois, Kansas, Missouri, Nebraska, and Vanderbilt.

All eleven players selected by Caspar Whitney for the 1890 All-America college football team came from the Big Three (Harvard Princeton, and Yale). Three of the honorees have been inducted into the College Football Hall of Fame: Harvard's great tackle Marshall "Ma" Newell, Yale's guard Pudge Heffelfinger, and Yale's halfback Thomas "Bum" McClung.

Conference and program changes

Awards and honors

All-Americans

The consensus All-America team included:

Statistical leaders
Player scoring most points: Philip King, Princeton, 145

Conference standings
The following is a potentially incomplete list of conference standings:

Independents

References